JSC "ISUZU RUS" (АО ИСУЗУ РУС) is a commercial vehicle manufacturer with headquarters in Ulyanovsk, Russia. The company was founded in 2006 as a joint venture between OAO Sollers, which contributed with a share of 66%, Isuzu, which participated with a share of 29%, and the Imperial Sojitz, which, had a share of 5%. Until the General Assembly of Shareholders on 11 January 2010, the company was named ZAO Severstal-Isuzu (ЗАО Северстальавто-Исузу). The company was established with an investment of 350 million rubles. The management reports to the Chief Executive Officer Franz Gerhard Hilgert.

From 2002, Sollers built Isuzu AUV as a Russian version of the Isuzu Panther. The model, however, had only limited success and could not argue with sales of just 780 units per year. Due to the low price, most of the units were produced at Sollers are exported to the Philippines. In the spring of 2009, the production of the AUV was then stopped completely. As a replacement a few months later were the Isuzu C-Series, the Isuzu D-series, and the Isuzu N-Series introduced. With the new model, the production program of the Japanese brand in Russia has increased to 25,000 units a year. Announcements of the work according to, production is to be doubled for a plant expansion in the coming years even.

In December 2015 Sollers Company sold its shares to the joint venture partners – Isuzu Motors Ltd. (74% in total) and Sojitz Corporation(26%). So now the company is fully Japanese.

Isuzu trucks are well known around the world are very popular. The reputation they deserve not only thanks to the successful marketing policy and competent management. Their main advantages are durability, reliability and endurance, combined with the accessibility and ease of use. All this makes the ISUZU vehicles popular in all regions of Russia.

Current models

Former models

External links
Official website JSC “ISUZU RUS”

Truck manufacturers of Russia
Isuzu
Russian companies established in 2007
Vehicle manufacturing companies established in 2007
Sollers JSC
Companies based in Ulyanovsk